Gidan Waya is a small town and Headquarters of Godogodo chiefdom about 18 km from Kafanchan in Jema'a Local Government Area of southern Kaduna state in the Middle Belt region of Nigeria. The town has a post office.

People and language

People
The people of Gidan Waya are predominantly Inindem and Oegworok by ethnicity. Other groups include: Gwandara, Atakat (Atakad), Atuku, Ninzam, Ham (also Known as Jaba), Nandu, Tari, Ningon, Atyap, Bajju, etc.

Education

The town houses the Kaduna State College of Education (KSCOE)'s permanent site.

See also
 List of villages in Kaduna State

References

External links

Populated places in Kaduna State